Cry Before Dawn are a four-piece rock band originally hailing  from Wexford in Ireland. They released several singles and two albums in the late 1980s and toured Ireland,  UK and US.

Career
They achieved attention in 1987 in the UK when they released their album Crimes of Conscience on the CBS label. The lead single from the album was "Gone Forever", which was released in Ireland in February 1987 and subsequently re-released there and in the UK in 1988. The follow-up singles were "The Seed That's Been Sown" and "Girl in the Ghetto".  The album was a success in Ireland and was critically acclaimed in the UK. The band made an appearance on the UK's Wogan chat show performing "Witness for the World".  Their popularity in Ireland was accounted by some to the fact that they came from Wexford, and lyrically their work connected more with the rural Ireland of the time than Dublin.  This was reflected in the promotional video for "Gone Forever", which very successfully set itself in an Irish small town. Their success in Ireland did not transfer to the UK however, although they  supported Big Country on their 1989 UK "Peace in Our Time" tour.

In 1988 Cry Before Dawn contributed a new track, "Silly Dreams" to the soundtrack of the Irish film, The Courier. Their second album Witness for the World was recorded in Wales and mixed in Los Angeles, California by Greg Ledanyi, and was released to lukewarm reception in 1989, again on Epic/CBS. The lead single, "Witness for the World", reached number 67 in the UK Singles Chart in June 1989, though the two follow-up singles: "Last of the Sun" and "No Living Without You" failed to chart. Around the time of their second album, the band appeared on the cover of the Irish music magazine Hot Press. In 1990, Cry Before Dawn were awarded best Irish group at the Irish National Music Awards. After parting with their record company, the band toured Ireland later the same year, after which they decided to split.

This initial disbanding was short-lived, however, and the band reformed with Paul Spencer replacing Tony Hall on guitar. Steve Belton subsequently took on the role of guitarist instead of Paul Spencer. After a single-only release, "To Be True" in 1992 the band split again, this time it seemed for good.

Brendan Wade subsequently teamed up with Paul Bell to form The Wild Swans, shortened to The Swans in 1999, and renamed again to Bell and Wade in 2000. Their songs were moderately successful in Ireland, being released on Ritz Records and their own record label.  Their most successful release was "Dancing at the Crossroads", released to coincide with County Wexford's success in the 1996 All-Ireland hurling final, which reached number 1 in the Irish pop chart.

Fellow band member Vince Doyle operates a Citroën dealership with his family and Pat Hayes is also living back in Wexford after 12 years in Stockholm, Sweden.

The band reformed in November 2010. Brendan Wade's own website gave the lineup for the reunion tour as Wade, Pat Hayes, Vinnie Doyle and Steve Belton. The first dates announced on the tour were Vicar Street, Dublin on 8 April 2011, and at Wexford Opera House on 14 May 2011.
In December 2012 the band issued a limited edition double album of their two nights at the Wexford Opera House, produced by Steve Belton, called  Live at the Opera House.

Lineup
2011
 Brendan Wade – vocals, acoustic guitar, uilleann pipes and whistle
 Vince Doyle – bass guitar
 Pat Hayes – drums, percussion, backing vocals
 Steve Belton – electric guitar
 Tony Hall (former member) – electric and acoustic guitars

Other former members included Mick O'Brien, Ray Sinnott, Paul Spencer, Dec Clarke and Dave Keerey (currently playing with Van Morrison).

Discography

Albums
 1987: Crimes of Conscience (CBS Records)
 1989: Witness for the World (CBS Records)
 2011: The Best of Cry Before Dawn (Sony Music Ireland)
 2011: Live at the Wexford Opera House (CBD Records)

Singles

References

External links
 Cry Before Dawn's official website
 Brendan Wade's official website
 Cry Before Dawn fansite
 The Cry Before Dawn web forum

Celtic rock groups
Irish rock music groups
Musical groups from County Wexford
Musical groups established in 1986
Musical groups disestablished in 1992
Musical groups reestablished in 2010